Zhanatilek is a settlement in Pavlodar Region, Kazakhstan. It is part of Bayanaul District and the administrative center of the Zhanatilek rural district (KATO code - 553641100). Population:

Geography 
The Ashchysu river flows to the west of the village.

References

External links
Bayanaul - Tourism (in Russian)

Populated places in Pavlodar Region